Charlie Byrd at the Village Vanguard is a live album by American jazz guitarist Charlie Byrd featuring tracks recorded  at the Village Vanguard in 1961 and released on the Riverside label in 1963. The album was first released on the Washington Records Offbeat imprint but only received limited distribution prior to Byrd signing with Riverside.

Reception

Allmusic awarded the album 3 stars stating "The direction is clear; Byrd was about to open the door to bossa nova, and you can hear him inching up to the starting gate here".

Track listing
 "Just Squeeze Me (But Don't Tease Me)" (Duke Ellington, Lee Gaines) - 13:00
 "Why Was I Born?" (Oscar Hammerstein II, Jerome Kern) - 5:57   
 "You Stepped Out of a Dream" (Nacio Herb Brown, Gus Kahn) - 6:48   
 "Fantasia on Which Side Are You On?" (Charlie Byrd) - 20:32

Personnel 
Charlie Byrd - guitar 
Keter Betts - bass
Buddy Deppenschmidt - drums

References 

1961 albums
Charlie Byrd live albums
Riverside Records albums
Albums recorded at the Village Vanguard